His Women is a 1961 Italian comedy film directed by and starring Ugo Tognazzi. It was shown as part of a retrospective on Italian comedy at the 67th Venice International Film Festival.

Cast
 Ugo Tognazzi as Stefano Garbelli
 Ilaria Occhini as Daniela
 Mario Carotenuto as Losi
 Marisa Merlini as Amalia
 Pinuccia Nava
 Armando Bandini
 Raimondo Vianello
 Aldo Berti
 Mario Castellani
 Margarete Robsahm as Carla
 Olimpia Cavalli
 Consalvo Dell'Arti
 Vera Gambaccioni
 Renato Mambor
 Arrigo Peri
 Massimo Righi
 Gianni Musy
 Franco Giacobini
 Franco Ressel

References

External links

1961 films
1961 comedy films
Italian comedy films
1960s Italian-language films
Italian black-and-white films
Films directed by Ugo Tognazzi
Films scored by Armando Trovajoli
Films with screenplays by Giulio Scarnicci
1960s Italian films